The 2012–13 season was Raith Rovers' fourth consecutive season in the Scottish First Division, having been promoted from the Scottish Second Division at the end of the 2008–09 season. Raith Rovers also competed in the Challenge Cup, League Cup and the Scottish Cup.

Management
Raith will be led by player-manager Grant Murray for the 2012–13 season, following the departure of John McGlynn. McGlynn signed a new one-year contract during the close season, and began leading the club for pre season. However, on 26 June 2012, McGlynn was appointed as the new manager of Heart of Midlothian, because he was under contract compensation was owed to Raith.

Results & fixtures

Pre season
A match against Alloa Athletic scheduled for 24 July, was cancelled.

Scottish First Division

Scottish Challenge Cup

Scottish League Cup

Scottish Cup

Player statistics

Captains

Squad 
Last updated May 2013

 
 

    

|}

Disciplinary record
Includes all competitive matches.

Last updated May 2013

Team statistics

League table

Division summary

Transfers

Players in

Players out

References

2012andndash;13
Raith Rovers